8BitMMO is a massively multiplayer game and a free-to-play created by American indie studio Archive Entertainment. It is currently in a public beta-testing stage and has been released on Steam on December 14, 2013, and currently on Early Access. It was created and is actively developed by Robby Zinchak. Users are encouraged to build in a shared world and undertake player vs environment and player vs player combat. The game was released on Steam.

On February 14, 2014, a chiptune soundtrack was included with music from Danimal Cannon, Zef, Protodome, and Honin Myo Audio.

Platforms
The game is currently playable via web browser. A desktop edition was released on December 13, 2013. It is also available for download on Steam.

Awards
 2013 Seattle Independent Game Competition - Winner
 Indie Prize Showcase, San Francisco - Director's Choice

References

External links

2013 video games
Browser-based multiplayer online games
Free-to-play video games
Windows games
Linux games
MacOS games
Video games developed in the United States